Fostoria Subdivision is a portion of the former Chesapeake and Ohio Railway Toledo to Columbus line. Today it is owned by CSX Transportation, one of the three subdivisions on the former C&O line.

Rail transportation in Ohio